Heidi Brooks is an American politician and former physician currently representing Lewiston in the Maine House of Representatives. First elected in 2014, Brooks serves on the Insurance and Financial Services Committee.

Background 

A native of the Lewiston-Auburn area, Brooks earned a bachelor's degree from Boston College and a medical degree from New York Medical College in 1996. In 2004, the Maine Board of Licensure in Medicine revoked her license. She applied to get it back the next year, but her application was denied based on personal health issues and substance abuse.

Political career 

After years of local political involvement, Brooks ran for the Maine House of Representatives in 2014. She was unopposed in the Democratic primary, and faced then-independent Mark Cayer in the general election. During the campaign, Brooks published promotional materials referring to herself with the designation "M.D." Maine law prohibits anyone who is not a licensed physician from referring to themselves as "M.D." if they purport to be a physician.

As a legislator, Brooks has pushed for single-payer health care in Maine.

Brooks served as the secretary of the Maine Democratic Party until 2018.

References 

Year of birth missing (living people)
Living people
Democratic Party members of the Maine House of Representatives
Boston College alumni
Politicians from Lewiston, Maine
New York Medical College alumni
21st-century American politicians
21st-century American women politicians
Women state legislators in Maine